Cibao FC Stadium is a football stadium in Santiago de los Caballeros, Dominican Republic.  It is currently used for football matches and hosts the home games of Cibao FC of the Liga Dominicana de Fútbol.  The stadium holds 8,000 spectators.

The stadium opened on March 8, 2015, hosting the sold-out inaugural match of the Liga Dominicana de Fútbol between Cibao and Atlético Vega Real. Later that month, the Dominican Republic national football team hosted a friendly against Cuba at the stadium, lost 3–0. The stadium would also host Haitian team Violette AC against American team Austin FC in the first leg due to the instability in Haiti.

International matches

References

External links

Football venues in the Dominican Republic
Santiago de los Caballeros
2015 establishments in the Dominican Republic
Sports venues completed in 2015